Paul D. McNicholas is an Irish-Canadian statistician. He is a professor and University Scholar in the Department of Mathematics and Statistics at McMaster University. In 2015, McNicholas was awarded the Tier 1 Canada Research Chair in Computational Statistics.  McNicholas uses computational statistics techniques, and mixture models in particular, to gain insight into large and complex datasets. He is editor-in-chief of the Journal of Classification.

Education and career 
McNicholas attended Trinity College Dublin where in 2004 he received a B.A. (Mod.) in Mathematics. He also holds an M.Sc. in High Performance Computing and a Ph.D. in Statistics. His 2007 Ph.D. thesis is entitled Topics in Unsupervised Learning.

McNicholas started his faculty career at University of Guelph in 2007. In 2014, he joined McMaster University. He has authored more than 100 scientific works cited over 4000 times. The majority of his research has been in on model-based clustering, specifically in developing novel finite mixture models for clustering and classification of multivariate data. He has published works on clustering high-dimensional data and the use of non-Gaussian mixtures. McNicholas has published two monographs: Mixture Model-Based Classification and Data Science with Julia.

Recognition 
In 2017, he was inducted into the College of New Scholars Artists and Scientists of the college of the Royal Society of Canada. In 2019, he was awarded an E.W.R. Steacie Memorial Fellowship from the Natural Sciences and Engineering Research Council of Canada.

References 

1981 births
Living people
Irish emigrants to Canada
Irish statisticians
21st-century Irish mathematicians
People from Cork (city)
Canada Research Chairs
21st-century Canadian mathematicians
Alumni of Trinity College Dublin
Academic journal editors
Academic staff of McMaster University
Academic staff of the University of Guelph
Computational statisticians